Nuneaton Griff F.C. are a football club based in Nuneaton, Warwickshire, England. They joined the Midland Football Combination Premier Division in 1999, and have been competing in the  since it was formed in 2014.
 
Griff have won the Midland Combination Premier Division on two occasions, including a League and cup treble in 2000–2001, earning them the Midland Combination Team of the Year Award, two Coventry Alliance Premier Division titles, one Birmingham Combination Premier Cup in 2000–2001, two Coventry Alliance Premier Cups, five Coventry Telegraph Cups, two Chapel End Nursing Cups, along with the Birmingham County Junior Cup in 1998–1999.

The club play their home games at the Pingles Stadium, which holds up to 6,000 spectators 232 seated. Griff's home kit is blue and white vertical striped shirts, with blue shorts, accompanied by blue socks. This combination has been used since the club formed in 1972.

History
The club was founded in 1972 as Nuneaton Amateurs when a dispute at the well-known local club Co-op Sports F.C. led to many members moving to the Nuneaton Griff and Coton Miners Welfare Ground. Nine players and officials paid £1 each to start the new club and Colin Wetton became the first manager, with Colin Rathbone as chairman.

The Amateurs initially played in the Coventry and North Warwickshire League, and in their first season were denied a championship success when their opponents failed to turn up for a late-season rescheduled game and the Coventry and North Warwickshire League decided there was not time to fit in another match.

By the 1990s the club was playing in the Coventry Alliance Football League, where they were dominant for a number of years. In 1998–99 the decision was made to apply for membership of the Midland Football Combination.

The club was controversially placed directly into the Premier Division but the Heartlanders, under manager Mark Green, repaid that faith by winning the championship in their first season 1999–2000 and repeated the feat the following season 2000–01, adding the Endsleigh Challenge Cup for good measure. In the process they made history by winning the Challenge Cup at Villa Park and the following night winning the Coventry Telegraph Cup at Highfield Road, Coventry, to become the only club ever to play in two cup finals on consecutive days at two different Premier League football grounds win them both.

In 2014 they were placed into the newly formed Midland Football League Division One. In the 2015-16 season the club reached the fifth round of the FA Vase for the first time, where they lost 3-0 to Salisbury at home in front of a record crowd of 870.

Honours
Midland Combination Premier Division
Winners: 1999–2000, 2000–01
Runners-up: 2010–11
Midland Combination Challenge Cup
Winners: 2000–01
Midland Combination Glover Rowley Team of the Year
Winners: 2000–01
Coventry Alliance Premier Division
Winners: 1996–97, 1997–98
Runners-up: 1998–99
Coventry Alliance Premier Division Cup
Winners: 1996–97, 1997–98
Birmingham County Junior Cup
Winners: 1998–99
Finalists: 1999–2000
Birmingham County Saturday Vase
Finalists: 2000–01
Birmingham County Midweek Floodlit Cup
Finalists: 2003–04, 2010–11, 2015-16
Coventry Telegraph Cup
Winners: 1972–73, 1996–97, 2000–01, 2001–02, 2008–09
Coventry Charity Cup
Winners: 1998–99, 1999–2000
Midland Combination Programme of the Year
Winners: 2007–08, 2009–10, 2010–11, 2011–12, 2012–13, 2013–14
Soccer Club Swap Shop
MFC Programme of the Season: 2007–08
Coventry Telegraph Junior Cup
Winners: 2008–09, 2014-15
Foleshill Charity Cup
Winners: 1989–90, 1997–98, 1999–2000
Roy Jones Memorial Cup
Winners: 2010-11
Coventry Alliance Fair Play Award
Winners: 2009–10
Nuneaton Cannon Sports 6-A-Side Champions Cup
Winners: 2013

Records
Best league performance: Midland Combination Premier Division champions, 1999–2000 and 2000–01
Best FA Cup performance: Second Qualifying Round 2012–13
Best FA Vase performance: Fifth Round, 2015–16

References

External links

Midland Football Combination
Association football clubs established in 1972
Football clubs in Warwickshire
1972 establishments in England
Midland Football League
Sport in Nuneaton
Football clubs in England
Coventry Alliance Football League